Hammami (also Romanized as Ḩammāmī) is a village in Seyfabad Rural District, in the Central District of Khonj County, Fars Province, Iran. At the 2006 census, its population was 51, in 11 families.

References 

Populated places in Khonj County